Empusa spinosa is a species of praying mantis in the family Empusidae.

See also
List of mantis genera and species

References

spinosa
Insects described in 1902